The 2017 Rugby League World Cup knockout stage takes place after the group stage of the 2017 Rugby League World Cup and culminates in the 2017 Rugby League World Cup Final. The quarter-finals consisted of eight teams; 1st, 2nd and 3rd from Group A and Group B, and the remaining two places were taken up by the winners of Group C and Group D.

Bracket 
{{Round8|3rdplace=no

|17 November – Darwin||46||0
|18 November – Wellington||2||4
|18 November – Christchurch||24||22
|19 November – Melbourne||36||6

|24 November – Brisbane||54||6
|25 November – Auckland||18 ||20

|2 December – Brisbane|  |6 |   |0 }}

 Quarter-finals 

Australia vs SamoaNotes:Valentine Holmes became the first player to score 5 tries in a World Cup match.

Tonga vs Lebanon

New Zealand vs FijiNotes:This was New Zealand's first loss in Wellington since 2007, when they lost to Australia 0-58.  
This match is only the second ever tryless World Cup match.
The match equalled the record for the lowest-scoring World Cup match ever played, with only six points being scored, when Great Britain beat France 6–0 in 1970. 
Fiji's four points is the lowest score by a winning team in World Cup history.

England vs Papua New Guinea

 Semi-finals 
 Australia vs Fiji Notes: Valentine Holmes broke his own record by becoming the first player to score 6 tries in a World Cup match.

 Tonga vs England 

 Final: Australia vs England Notes:'''
 Australia became the first team to win the Rugby League World Cup title eleven times.	
 This was the first time a team won the World Cup on home soil since 1977.	
 The aggregate 6 points scored was the least in a Rugby League World Cup final.
 This match saw a new equal record low for tries in a Rugby League World Cup final with only one try scored.

References

2017 Rugby League World Cup